Nautilus is a program which allows two parties to securely communicate using modems or TCP/IP.  It runs from a command line and is available for the Linux and Windows operating systems.  The name was based upon Jules Verne's Nautilus and its ability to overcome a Clipper ship as a play on Clipper chip.
The program was originally developed by 
Bill Dorsey, Andy Fingerhut, Paul Rubin, Bill Soley, and David Miller.

Nautilus is historically significant in the realm of secure communications because it was one of the first programs which were released as open source to the general public which used strong encryption.  It was created as a response to the Clipper chip in which the US government planned to use a key escrow scheme on all products which used the chip.  This would allow them to monitor "secure" communications.  Once this program and another similar program PGPfone were available on the internet, the proverbial cat was "out of the bag" and it would have been nearly impossible to stop the use of strong encryption for telephone communications.

External links
 new Nautilus homepage from  May 1 2014 on
 "Can Nautilus Sink Clipper?"  Article in Wired, Aug 1995 

Secure communication
Cryptographic software
VoIP software